Franco Andrea Bonelli (10 November 1784 – 18 November 1830) was an Italian ornithologist, entomologist  and collector.

Life
Very little is known about the early life of Bonelli: he was born in Cuneo and was interested from an early age in the fauna which surrounded him, making collecting trips,  preparing specimens and noting his observations.

He became a member of the Reale Società Agraria di Torino in 1807 when he presented his first studies relating to the Coleoptera of Piedmont. The high quality of these studies attracted the interest of the naturalists of his time.

In April 1810, George Vat was sent to Turin by the French government to reorganize the University of Turin and begin its fusion with the Impériale University founded by Napoleon. Vat was very impressed by Bonelli's knowledge. Vat encouraged him to further his knowledge by coming to follow courses at the Natural History Museum in Paris. 

Bonelli took this advice so as obtain a professor's chair in the new university. In September 1810, he arrived in Paris.

In 1811, Bonelli was finally named professor of zoology at the University of Turin and keeper of the natural history museum of zoology.  During his time at the university, he formed one of the largest ornithological collections in Europe.

In 1811, Bonelli wrote a Catalogue of the Birds of Piedmont, in which he described 262 species. In 1815, he discovered the bird Bonelli's warbler (Phylloscopus bonelli), named by Louis Vieillot in 1819. In the same year, he discovered Bonelli's eagle (Hieraaetus fasciatus) that was likewise named by Vieillot in 1822.

The successor of Bonelli at the Turin Museum was Carlo Giuseppe Gené.

Achievements
Bonelli is most notable for his work on birds and on the beetle family Carabidae. Since he was an early worker on Coleoptera many of his genera later became Families, sub families and tribes. Also many of his genera survive.

Instances are the:

Omophroninae; Pseudomorphinae; Brachininae; Trechinae; Harpalinae; Pseudomorphinae; Siagoninae; Pterostichinae and Scaritinae - Subfamilies
Dromiidae 1810 Family
 Pterostichini Tribe

Works

Catalogue des Oiseaux du Piemont (1811).
Observations Entomologique. Première partie. Mém. Acad. Sci. Turin 18: 21–78, Tabula Synoptica  (1810).
Observations entomologiques. Deuxieme partie. Mém. Acad. Sci. Turin 20: 433-484  (1813)

The last two are founding works of entomology, introducing many new taxa.

Sources

Achille Casale and Pier Mauro Giachino "Franco Andrea Bonelli (1784-1830), an Entomologist in Turin at the Beginning of the XIX century", in Proceedings of a Symposium (28 August 1996, Florence, Italy). Phylogeny and Classification of Caraboidea. XX International Congress of Entomology, Museo Regionale di Scienze Naturali Torino (1998).

1784 births
1830 deaths
People from Cuneo
Italian entomologists
Italian zoologists
Italian ornithologists